Puente San Pablo is a small town in Bolivia. It as a population of 2341 (2012). It has 97% humidity.

References

Populated places in Beni Department